The National Marine Aquarium of Namibia is an aquarium in Swakopmund, Namibia. The Aquarium features fauna from the cold Benguela Current in the southern Atlantic Ocean.

References

Aquaria in Namibia
Swakopmund
Buildings and structures in Erongo Region
Articles needing infobox zoo